String of pearls may refer to:

 A necklace made of pearls

Arts and entertainment
 A String of Pearls (film), a 1912 film directed by D. W. Griffith
 The String of Pearls, an 1846 serial novel that introduced the character Sweeney Todd
 String of Pearls (album), a 1991 album by Deborah Conway, or the title song
 String of Pearls: A Greatest Hits Collection, a 2000 album by Prairie Oyster
 String of Pearls, a 2021 album by Annabelle Chvostek
 "A String of Pearls" (song), a 1941 jazz standard written by Jerry Gray and Eddie DeLange, popularized by Glenn Miller
 Octatonic scale, known as "string of pearls" in traditional Persian music

Other uses
 String of Pearls (Indian Ocean), a geopolitical theory
 Curio rowleyanus, or string-of-pearls, a flowering plant
 Pearl circle, or string of pearls, a design element on some coins

See also
 "A String of Pearls Twined with Golden Flowers", a Romanian fairy tale